Francesco Italia (born 11 September 1972 in Milan) is an Italian politician.

Italia ran as an independent for the office of Mayor of Syracuse at the 2018 Italian local elections, supported by a centre-left coalition. He won and took office on 27 June 2018.

See also
2018 Italian local elections
List of mayors of Syracuse, Sicily

References

External links
 

1972 births
Living people
Mayors of places in Sicily
People from Syracuse, Sicily
LGBT mayors
Italian LGBT politicians